Polly Borland (born 1959) is an Australian photographer who formerly resided in England from 1989 to 2011, and now lives in Los Angeles, United States. She is known both for her editorial portraits and for her work as a photographic artist.

Biography
Borland was born in Melbourne where her father gave her a camera with Nikkor lenses when she was 16. She graduated from Prahran College in 1983, where she discovered Diane Arbus, Weegee and, Larry Clark, all of whom influenced her work. On leaving art school, she became a portrait photographer, contributing to the Australian edition of Vogue. In 1989, she moved to the United Kingdom where she specialized in stylized portraits and reportage photography. Her work has been featured in newspapers and magazines worldwide.

A number of books on her work and exhibitions have been published. In 2001, her first series The Babies examined the way men can enjoy dressing up as infants, with an essay by Susan Sontag, an introduction by Mark Holborn. In 2008, she produced Bunny, a collection of photographs about English actress Gwendoline Christie.  Bunny also features a fairy-tale written by Will Self and a poem by Nick Cave. Smudge (2011) features abstract depictions of three of her friends she uses as models; musician Nick Cave, photographer Mark Vessey and fashion designer Sherald Lambden. All three appear half naked, faces obscured, wearing body stockings, tights, wigs, and other fanciful objects of clothing. In February 2013 the documentary Polly Borland - Polymorphous was released.

Borland was awarded an Honorary Fellowship of the Royal Photographic Society in 2002.

Polly Borland and her husband, director John Hillcoat, live in Los Angeles, California.

Works or Publications

Books

Articles

Filmography 
 Polly Borland - Polymorphous
 MOCAtv - IO Echo "Berlin, It's All A Mess" Directors John Hillcoat & Polly Borland

Exhibitions and notable works
1984: Polly Borland, George Paton Gallery, Melbourne
1999: The Babies, 1999 Meltdown Festival curated by Nick Cave, Southbank, London
1999: one of six Australian photographers exhibited in "Glossy: Faces Magazines Now" at the National Portrait Gallery, Canberra
2000: Australians, National Portrait Gallery, London
2001: Australians, National Portrait Gallery, Canberra
2001: Australians, Monash Gallery of Art, Melbourne
2002 The Babies, Anna Schwartz Gallery, Melbourne
2008: Bunny, Murray White Room, Melbourne; featuring Gwendoline Christie
2008: Bunny, Michael Hoppen Gallery, London; featuring Gwendoline Christie
2010: Smudge, Murray White Room, Melbourne
2011: Smudge, AB Gloria, Madrid 
2011: Smudge, Other Criteria, London
2011: Smudge, Paul Kasmin Gallery, New York City
2012: Everything I want to be when I grow up, University of Queensland Art Museum, Queensland
2012: Pupa, Murray White Room, Melbourne
2013: YOU, Paul Kasmin Gallery, New York
2014: Wonky, The Australian Centre of Photography, Melbourne
2014: YOU, Murray White Room, Melbourne

Borland's work has also been exhibited at the Australian Centre for Photography, Sydney; The Auckland Triennial, Auckland; GASK, Gallery of the Central Bohemian Region, Czech Republic; the Scottish National Portrait Gallery, Edinburgh; The Institute of Modern Art, Brisbane; MONA, Tasmania, and the N.S.W. Gallery of Art.

Borland's portrait of Queen Elizabeth II, was commissioned by Buckingham Palace to commemorate her golden jubilee in 2002, is unusual for its brightness and its intimate proximity to Her Majesty. It was exhibited at London's National Portrait Gallery and at Windsor Castle.

Her work is included in the March 2020 Adelaide Biennial of Australian Art at the Art Gallery of South Australia, which is titled "Monster Theatres".

Awards and nominations

ARIA Music Awards
The ARIA Music Awards is an annual awards ceremony that recognises excellence, innovation, and achievement across all genres of Australian music. They commenced in 1987. 

! 
|-
| 1996
| Polly Borland and John Hillcoat for "Sit on My Hands" by Frente!
| Best Video
| 
|  
|-

References

External links
 
 
 Portraits by Polly Borland in the collection of the National Portrait Gallery, London

1959 births
Living people
People from Melbourne
Australian women photographers
Australian portrait photographers
Australian emigrants to England
Granta people